Hans-Jürgen Hartmann (born 12 April 1955) is a German bobsledder. He competed in the two man event at the 1984 Winter Olympics.

References

External links
 

1955 births
Living people
German male bobsledders
Olympic bobsledders of West Germany
Bobsledders at the 1984 Winter Olympics
Sportspeople from Ludwigshafen
20th-century German people